The Diamond Pipeline is an oil pipeline system that runs from Cushing, Oklahoma to Memphis, Tennessee in the United States. In 2016, the engineering plans, permits, and construction will commence, anticipating to finish construction of the pipeline in 2017. According to the U.S. Army Corps of Engineers, the pipeline will cross approximately 500 bodies of water including streams and rivers. The pipeline will also cross approximately 11 drinking water sources.

References

Crude oil pipelines in the United States
Energy infrastructure in Oklahoma
Energy infrastructure in Tennessee
Oil pipelines in Oklahoma
Oil pipelines in Arkansas
Oil pipelines in Tennessee